The Warning is a 1927 American silent drama film directed by George B. Seitz. A surviving print of the film is at George Eastman House Motion Picture Collection.

Cast
 Jack Holt as Tom Fellows / Col. Robert Wellsley
 Dorothy Revier as Mary Blake
 Frank Lackteen as Tso Lin
 Pat Harmon as London Charlie
 Eugene Strong as No. 24
 George Kuwa as Ah Sung
 Norman Trevor as Sir James Gordon

References

External links

1927 films
American silent feature films
1927 drama films
Films directed by George B. Seitz
American black-and-white films
Silent American drama films
Columbia Pictures films
Surviving American silent films
1920s American films